Simiti is a town and municipality located in the Bolívar Department, northern Colombia.

History 
Simití was founded in 1537 by Antonio de Lebrija and Juan Maldonado, two soldiers of the expedition from Santa Marta to the Muisca Confederation, led by Gonzalo Jiménez de Quesada.

References 

Municipalities of Bolívar Department
Populated places established in 1537
1537 establishments in the Spanish Empire